= Pakharwadi =

Village in Maharashtra

- Village
- Interactive map of Pakharwadi
- Country: India
- State: Maharashtra

Pakharwadi is a small village in Ratnagiri district, Maharashtra state in Western India. The 2011 Census of India recorded a total of 203 residents in the village. Pakharwadi's geographical area is 35 hectares (86 acres).
